Edmonton-Sherwood Park was a provincial electoral district in Alberta, Canada, mandated to return a single member to the Legislative Assembly of Alberta using the first past the post method of voting from 1979 to 1986.

History
The electoral district was split in 1986 between Edmonton-Gold Bar and Sherwood Park.

Members of the Legislative Assembly (MLAs)

Election results

1979 general election

1982 general election

See also
List of Alberta provincial electoral districts

References

Further reading

External links
Elections Alberta
The Legislative Assembly of Alberta

Former provincial electoral districts of Alberta
Politics of Edmonton